The twenty-fourth government of Israel was formed by Yitzhak Shamir of Likud on 11 June 1990. This followed the failure of Alignment leader Shimon Peres to form a government, after the Alignment had pulled out of the previous national unity coalition, in an incident which became known as the dirty trick.

Shamir's coalition included Likud, the National Religious Party, Shas, Agudat Yisrael, Degel HaTorah, the New Liberal Party, Tehiya, Tzomet, Moledet, Unity for Peace and Immigration and Geulat Yisrael, and held 62 of the 120 seats in the Knesset. Some authors (including political scientist Clive A. Jones and historians Avi Shlaim and Benny Morris) later asserted that the 24th government of Israel was the most right-wing government in the country's history. Tehiya, Tzomet and Moledet all left the coalition in late 1991 and early 1992 in protest at Shamir's participation in the Madrid Conference, but the government remained in office until Yitzhak Rabin formed the twenty-fifth government, following the Labor Party's victory in the 1992 elections.

Cabinet members

1 Although Ne'eman was not a Knesset member at the time, he was a member of Tehiya.

2 Although Deri was not a Knesset member at the time, he was a member of Shas.

References

External links
Tenth Knesset: Government 24 Knesset website

 24
1990 establishments in Israel
1992 disestablishments in Israel
Cabinets established in 1990
Cabinets disestablished in 1992
1990 in Israeli politics
1991 in Israeli politics
1992 in Israeli politics
 24